Special Order 40 is a police mandate implemented in 1979 by the Los Angeles Police Department (LAPD), its Police Chief Daryl Gates and the Los Angeles City Council preventing LAPD officers from questioning people for the sole purpose of determining their immigration status.  The mandate was passed in an effort to encourage undocumented aliens to report crimes without intimidation.  The first section of the order states:

2008 incident

In 2008, Special Order 40 came under increased fire from conservative commentators Doug McIntyre, Kevin James,   Walter Moore and various other figures in the public eye for what they saw as allowing the scenario that resulted in the homicide of Jamiel Shaw II by Pedro Espinoza, an illegal immigrant and gang member. The murder of Shaw was linked to Special Order 40 by its opponents because the alleged assailant had been arrested by Culver City police and then later released by the Los Angeles County Jail, although those two jurisdictions are separate and distinct from the City of Los Angeles and therefore were not subject to Special Order 40.

In the wake of the Shaw murder, the Los Angeles City Council considered amending Special Order 40 with language specifying that police notify immigration authorities if that individual was not in the country legally.  Then-retired Los Angeles Police Chief Daryl Gates spoke to the council to defend Special Order 40.  He mentioned that the order already mandates that when law violators are arrested, the first thing police are supposed to do is notify immigration if they believe they're undocumented.  The order was also defended by then Police Chief William J. Bratton.  The City Council eventually chose not to amend the order.

See also
Arizona SB 1070
Alabama HB 56

References

Further reading

External links 
Gates DF (1979-11-27). LAPD Special Order 40, original version. Viewed 2010-04-30.
City of Los Angeles: REPORT OF THE RAMPART INDEPENDENT REVIEW PANEL - A Report to the Los Angeles Board of Police Commissioners Concerning Special Order 40
Los Angeles Police Department: Newsroom - LAPD Holds Community Meeting Regarding Special Order 40
Los Angeles Police Department: Chief's Message, June 2005 (contains comments from Chief of Police William J. Bratton on page 2 about his May 2005 clarification of S.O. 40)
Walter Moore: Jamiel's Law (actual text of proposed ordinance authored by Walter Moore in the wake of the homicide of Jamiel Shaw II)
Walter Moore: Jamiel's Law (official web site)

Special Order 40
Illegal immigration to the United States